Sir (James) Angus Gillan (11 October 1885 – 23 April 1981) was a Scottish rower and colonial service official. He competed in the 1908 Summer Olympics and in the 1912 Summer Olympics.

Biography
Gillan was born in Aberdeen, Scotland, and was educated at Edinburgh Academy and Magdalen College, Oxford. He rowed for Oxford in the Boat Race in 1907, but missed the 1908 race because of a severe attack of influenza. He also rowed for his college and the Magdalen College coxless four won the Stewards' Challenge Cup and the Visitors' Challenge Cup at Henley Royal Regatta in 1907 and 1908.
The Magdalen crew was chosen to represent Great Britain rowing at the 1908 Summer Olympics, and Gillan was in the four with Collier Cudmore, John Somers-Smith and Duncan Mackinnon. The crew won the gold medal for Great Britain and defeated a Leander crew. Gillan rowed for Oxford again in the Boat Race in 1909.

In 1909 Gillan joined the Sudan Political Service, but returned on leave in 1911 and as a member of Leander Club and was in the crew that won the Grand Challenge Cup at Henley in 1911. He was home on leave again in 1912 and was member of the British eight which won the gold medal rowing at the 1912 Summer Olympics in Stockholm. He was in the UK again in 1917 when he married Margaret Douglas Ord Mackenzie at Holy Trinity Church, Brompton.
 
Gillan served  in the Sudan for thirty years and became Civil Secretary in 1934. He was appointed a CMG in 1935 and a KBE in 1939.  After World War II, Gillan headed the  Empire Division of the British Council and played a major part in the organization of the 1948 Summer Olympics in London. In 1949 he left the Colonial Service and became the British Council representative in Australia until 1951. Back in England, he was chairman of the Royal Overseas League from 1955 to 1962.

Gillan died at Leigh, Surrey, at the age of 95.

See also
List of Oxford University Boat Race crews

References

External links
 
 
 

1885 births
1981 deaths
Alumni of Magdalen College, Oxford
Scottish male rowers
Olympic rowers of Great Britain
Rowers at the 1908 Summer Olympics
Rowers at the 1912 Summer Olympics
Olympic gold medallists for Great Britain
British colonial governors and administrators in Africa
Olympic medalists in rowing
Sportspeople from Aberdeen
People educated at Edinburgh Academy
Scottish Olympic medallists
Scottish colonial officials
Scottish knights
Members of Leander Club
Oxford University Boat Club rowers
Medalists at the 1908 Summer Olympics
Medalists at the 1912 Summer Olympics
Anglo-Egyptian Sudan people
Sudan Political Service officers